Dr. Neelam Man Singh Chowdhry (born 14 April 1951) is a Chandigarh-based theatre artist who has worked around the world. She was awarded the 2003 Sangeet Natak Akademi Award in the Theatre Direction category. She was the recipient of the 2011 Padma Shri Award. She is Professor Emeritus at Punjab University. Her well-known plays include Kitchen Katha, The Suit, Yerma, Nagamandala, The Mad Woman of Chaillot, Little Eyolf, Bitter Fruit, Naked Voices, Stree Patra and Gumm Hai.

Early life 
Neelam was born in 1950 and grew up in Amritsar, Punjab. She finished her Master's degree in art history from the Punjab University, Chandigarh. She graduated from the National School of Drama in Delhi in 1975 and got trained under Ebrahim Alkazi.

References

1951 births
Living people
Artists from Chandigarh
Recipients of the Padma Shri in arts
Artists from Amritsar
Recipients of the Sangeet Natak Akademi Award